Yoana del Carmen Don (born January 30, 1991) is an Argentine Glamour Model and beauty pageant titleholder . She represented Argentina at Miss World 2014. Yoana was elected Miss World Argentina at an event held at Centro de Convenciones de City Center Rosario in December 2013. She also represented her country at Miss International 2016 in Tokyo, Japan, where she placed in the Top 15. Don will represent Argentina at Miss Grand International 2017 on October 25, 2017 in Vietnam.

References

Argentine beauty pageant winners
Miss World 2014 delegates
Living people
1991 births
Miss International 2016 delegates